Eye of the Eagle may refer to:
 eagle eye, the eye of the eagle (the bird)
 Eye of the Eagle (album), a 1998 album by Dave Bainbridge and Dave Fitzgerald
 Eye of the Eagle (1987 film), an American action film
 Eye of the Eagle (1997 film), a Danish adventure film

See also 
 Eagle Eye (disambiguation)
 Eagle Vision (disambiguation)